Meyer Joshua Nurenberger (1911 – August 11, 2001) was a Jewish journalist, author and publisher.  He grew up in Europe but immigrated to the New World in 1939, living in the USA where he worked as a war correspondent and journalist, before moving to Canada where he founded and edited the Canadian Jewish News.

Early life
M.J. Nurenberger was born in Kraków but was raised in France and educated in Belgium where he began his career in journalism as a parliamentary reporter. He emigrated to the United States in February 1939, months before the outbreak of World War II. He was able to rescue his parents and 3 sisters from Europe before the war.  They spent the war in England and Cuba and came to New York in 1945.

While in New York City he was ordained a rabbi but decided to continue his career in journalism. He found a job with the conservative Morgen Journal (Jewish Morning Journal), a Yiddish daily published in New York, becoming its editor in 1947 and also wrote a column for the influential Yiddish weekly Algemeiner Journal.

During World War II, Nurenberger was a war correspondent whose dispatches were carried by the Jewish press throughout the world. Following the war he covered the Nuremberg Trials and later also covered the trial of Adolf Eichmann in Israel.

Canada
In 1957, at the encouragement of Menachem Begin, Nurenberger moved to Toronto, Ontario, Canada, to become editor of the Yiddish weekly, Der Yiddishe Journal.  Three years later, he and his wife Dorothy Cohn Nurenberger founded the Canadian Jewish News, an English-language weekly which became the leading newspaper of Canada's Jewish community. Following the death of his wife in 1971, Nurenberger sold the newspaper to a consortium of Jewish philanthropists supportive of the Canadian Jewish Congress.

Nurenberger was a Revisionist Zionist, having become involved with the Irgun in the 1940s.  He was later a supporter of Herut and a friend of its leader, Menachem Begin, and supported Begin and his movement editorially.  He also advised Progressive Conservative Party leader John Diefenbaker on Jewish issues. Disappointed by the turn of the Canadian Jewish News under its new owners, he founded the Jewish Times in 1974 as an independent journal of news analysis, and published it until 1992, when he began suffering from Alzheimer's disease.

Nurenberger's daughter, Atara Beck, worked as a journalist for the Jewish Tribune before moving to Israel in 2011.

Nurenberger founded and edited the French-language Jewish monthly magazine Nouveau Monde, which was published and distributed in Montreal in the late 1960s and early 1970s. In 1972, Nurenberger appointed writer Victor Teboul as its editor-in-chief.

The Scared and the Doomed
He is the author of The Scared and the Doomed - The Jewish Establishment vs. The Six Million, published in 1985, which challenges the American Jewish leadership during World War II,  castigating Labour Zionist and American Jewish leaders for opposing Vladimir Jabotinsky's proposal that a Jewish army be mobilised and sent to Europe during World War II, and argues that European Jewry could have been saved.

References

External links
 https://www.thestar.com/news/obituary/ntos/article/108455--m-nurenberger-was-founder-of-jewish-news
 http://www.billgladstone.ca/?p=4099
Obituary in the Canadian Jewish News.

1911 births
2001 deaths
Canadian Zionists
Belgian journalists
Male journalists
Belgian emigrants to Canada
20th-century Polish Jews
Canadian newspaper editors
Canadian male journalists
Canadian newspaper founders
20th-century Canadian newspaper publishers (people)
Canadian non-fiction writers
20th-century Canadian journalists
Jewish Canadian journalists